= Khuman railway station =

Railway station in Pakistan

Coordinates: 25.9564°N 68.1872°E

General information
- Owner: Ministry of Railways

Other information
- Station code: KQM
Location

Khuman railway station (Urdu: کھومان ریلوے اسٹیشن) is located in Pakistan. It is between Manjhand and Sann stations on Kotri-Attock line.

== See also ==
- List of railway stations in Pakistan
- Pakistan Railways
